Paralamyctes cammooensis is a species of centipede in the Henicopidae family. It was first described in 2004 by palaeontologist Gregory Edgecombe.

Distribution
The species occurs in coastal eastern Australia in Queensland and New South Wales. The type locality is Cammoo Caves, Mount Etna Caves National Park, near Rockhampton in Central Queensland.

Behaviour
The centipedes are solitary terrestrial predators that inhabit plant litter and soil.

References

 

 
cammooensis
Centipedes of Australia
Endemic fauna of Australia
Animals described in 2004
Taxa named by Gregory Edgecombe